Leon (born Jürgen Göbel, 4 April 1969, Lippetal, North Rhine-Westphalia) is a German singer, best known for his participation in the 1996 Eurovision Song Contest, when he was controversially eliminated at the pre-selection stage.

Career
Leon had taken part in the 1996 German Eurovision selection with the song "Planet of Blue", which had gained a comprehensive victory in a public televote. It was a very contemporary, techno-influenced song which had been expected to do well in the contest. The 1996 Eurovision Song Contest was to take place in Oslo on 18 May. Hosts Norway were given an automatic place in the contest, but as 29 other countries were chasing the 22 remaining places, it was decided to hold an audio-only pre-qualifier on 29 March where a jury from each country would listen to all the songs and vote in the normal ESC manner, with the bottom seven songs being eliminated. To universal surprise, "Planet of Blue" finished 24th in the voting, and failed to qualify for the contest. However, the song has remained popular among fans of the contest, placing 249th out of over 1,600 Eurovision songs in the 2021 edition of ESC250, a renowned fan vote run by the Belgian website Songfestival.be.

The unexpected result caused consternation in Germany and left the European Broadcasting Union facing the situation where its largest contributor at the time had to miss the contest. To avoid a re-occurrence in future years, the EBU introduced the controversial "Big Four" rule whereby Germany, along with France, Spain and United Kingdom (later become "Big Five" with Italy's return in 2011) as the largest contributors, would be guaranteed a place in the Eurovision final each year.

Undeterred by disappointment, Leon returned to the German Eurovision selection in 1997 with "Schein (meine kleine Taschenlampe)", which finished second. He remains active and continues to release new material.

Discography 
Singles
1996: "Planet of Blue"
1996: "Loving You"
1996: "Follow Your Heart"
1997: "Schein (meine kleine Taschenlampe)"
1998: "Hast du Ihn geküsst"
1998: "Bloss so'n Flirt"
1999: "Mayday Mayday"
2001: "Donde vas"
2004: "Mi amor"
2005: "C'est passeé"
2006: "Den Mond berühren"
2007: "Schau in mein Herz"
2008: "Soleil Bonjour"
2009: "C'est fini, ma chérie"

Albums
1996: Leon
1998: Einfach verknallt

References

External links 
 Official website 

1969 births
Living people
People from Soest (district)
German male singers
Eurovision Song Contest entrants for Germany
Eurovision Song Contest entrants of 1996